Yoshisada is a masculine Japanese given name.

Possible writings
Yoshisada can be written using different combinations of kanji characters. Here are some examples: 

義貞, "justice, chastity"
義定, "justice, establish"
吉貞, "good luck, chastity"
吉定, "good luck, establish"
善貞, "virtuous, chastity"
善定, "virtuous, establish"
芳貞, "fragrant/virtuous, chastity"
芳定, "fragrant/virtuous, establish"
良貞, "good, chastity"
良定, "good, establish"
喜貞, "rejoice, chastity"
喜定, "rejoice, establish"
慶貞, "congratulate, chastity"
佳定, "skilled, establish"
嘉定, "excellent, establish"

The name can also be written in hiragana よしさだ or katakana ヨシサダ.

Notable people with the name
, Japanese samurai and daimyō
, Japanese samurai
, Japanese actor and voice actor
, Japanese astronomer
, Japanese judoka

See also
7300 Yoshisada, a main-belt asteroid

Japanese masculine given names